Wilhelm Steenbeck invented the editing system known as Steenbeck, which is a brand name that has become synonymous with a type of flatbed editor system. He founded The Steenbeck company in 1931 in Hamburg.

References

Year of birth missing
Year of death missing
20th-century German inventors